Petani, officially known in Malay as  (sometimes ), is a populated area in Tutong, the town of Tutong District, Brunei. It is officially a village-level subdivision under the mukim or subdistrict of Pekan Tutong, as well as a designated postcode area with the postcode TA1741. Parts of Petani area is also under the spatial jurisdiction of the municipality of Tutong. Petani is de facto the commercial area of the town.

References 

Petani